Mississippi Highway 6 (MS 6) runs east–west from MS 161 in Lyon, east to MS 25 near Amory. West of Tupelo, it is concurrent with US 278. Points of interest along the route include the University of Mississippi, Trace State Park, Natchez Trace Parkway, the Elvis Presley Birthplace, and Tombigbee State Park.

Route description

MS 6 begins in the Mississippi Delta region in Coahoma County at an intersection with MS 161 near the Clarksdale-Lyon city line. It heads east as a two-lane highway for not even a mile to an interchange with US 49/US 61, where it becomes concurrent with US 278. MS 6/US 278 now leave the Clarksdale area and pass through farmland for several miles, where it crosses the same bayou three times, before entering Quitman County.

MS 6/US 278 pass through Barksdale before having an intersection with MS 316 at West Marks and entering the town of Marks shortly thereafter. It mostly bypasses the town along its northern outskirts, where it has an intersection with MS 3 and crosses the Coldwater River. The highway now enters Panola County, after passing through Bobo and crossing the Peach Creek.

MS 6/US 278 pass through Locke Station before crossing the Tallahatchie River and entering Batesville shortly thereafter. The highway passes through some neighborhoods and business districts as it bypasses downtown along its southern side and has a concurrency with MS 35. It widens to a four-lane undivided highway at an intersection with US 51, where MS 35 splits off, before passing through a major business district to come to an interchange with I-55 (Exit 243). MS 6/US 278 now widen to a divided highway as it leaves Batesville and enters the North Central Hills region. The highway now has an interchange and concurrency with MS 315, which splits off unsigned onto Black Jack Road, providing access to Sardis Lake and John W. Kyle State Park. MS 6/US 278 now cross into Lafayette County.

MS 6/US 278 now enter Oxford and bypass that city along a southern freeway bypass, where it passes by the main campus of the University of Mississippi (Ole Miss), as well as having interchanges with MS 7 and MS 334. It has an at-grade intersection with University Avenue (unsigned MS 738) before leaving Oxford. The highway now passes through Lafayette Springs, where it has an intersection with a county road connecting to MS 336 (Lafayette Springs Road/CR 251), before crossing into Pontotoc County.

MS 334 represents the former alignment of MS 6 between Oxford and Pontotoc.

MS 6/US 278 now pass through Thaxton before having an intersection with MS 338, and a short concurrency with MS 336, to enter Pontotoc. It bypasses the city along its northern edge as an expressway, with an interchange at MS 15, at-grade intersection at MS 345, and interchanges with MS 9 and MS 338. MS 6/US 278 pass by Trace State Park before crossing into Lee County.

MS 338 represents the former alignment of MS 6 through downtown Pontotoc.

MS 6/US 278 continue through farmland as an expressway to have an interchange with the Natchez Trace Parkway before entering Tupelo, traveling along the southern city limits to have interchanges with small city streets, as well as having an intersection with MS 145 and an interchange with US 45 along the city line with Verona. At this interchange, MS 6 splits off from US 278 and heads north along the US 45 freeway through the eastern side of the city of Tupelo for several miles. They come to the eastern edge of downtown, where MS 6 splits from US 45 at an interchange and heads east along MS 178 (E Main Street). They immediately cross Town Creek before entering some neighborhoods as a four-lane undivided highway, where MS 6 splits off and heads south along its own path near the Elvis Presley Birthplace. MS 6 now leaves Tupelo as a two-lane (Briar Ridge Road) and heads south through Plantersville, where MS 6 has an intersection with State Park Road, which leads to Tombigbee State Park. The highway winds its way southeast to Nettleton, where MS 6 crosses into Monroe County at the center of downtown at an intersection with Main Street (unsigned MS 774).

MS 6 turns left along Main Street to leave Nettleton and head southeast through wooded areas (as it enters the Appalachian Mountains foothills) for several miles, where it has intersections with Old Highway 6 (unsigned MS 776) and MS 371, to pass through Bigbee. The highway now crosses the Tennessee Tombigbee Waterway (Tombigbee River) into Amory, with MS 6 coming to an end at the northern edge of downtown at an intersection with MS 25 (Main Street).

History

The entire route, from 1997 and prior, was signed solely as MS 6. In early 1998, US 278 was extended from Tupelo, across northern Mississippi, to Arkansas, with the majority of the route being placed along MS 6. US 278 went unsigned for many years, well into the 2000s, and when it finally was signed, MS 6 signs were never removed.

The entire route of MS 6/US 278 between Batesville and Tupelo has been upgraded to a four-lane divided highway as part of Corridor V of the Appalachian Development Highway System.

MS 6 previously continued east of Amory, through the town of Hatley, the communities of Wise Gap (where it had an intersection with MS 8) and Greenwood Springs, to the Alabama state line at the village of Gattman. This section of MS 6 was decommissioned when US 278 was originally commissioned through the area in 1951 (signed 1952).

Controversy over parking on the highway shoulder

On September 4, 2004, a 19-year-old University of Mississippi student named Dustin Dill from Orlando, Florida struck and killed a fellow student, 23-year-old pharmacy major and Oxford native Amie Ewing, on this highway. Dill had a 0.12 percent blood-alcohol level when his Honda Accord struck Ewing and sent her into a parked Oldsmobile Achieva. Ewing had parked along the shoulder of Highway 6, then walked to Vaught–Hemingway Stadium to watch the Ole Miss Rebels football team play the 

Mississippi state and Oxford city laws prohibit the use of state highway shoulders as parking lots; however, this law went unenforced in Oxford on Saturdays when the Rebels played home games. Since this event, the 'no parking' laws along this highway have been enforced. This highway is now also known as "Amie Ewing Memorial Highway".

Major intersections

References

External links

Magnolia Meanderings
Mississippi Department of Transportation
Amie Ewing Memorial Highway sign

006
Transportation in Coahoma County, Mississippi
Transportation in Quitman County, Mississippi
Transportation in Panola County, Mississippi
Transportation in Lafayette County, Mississippi
Transportation in Pontotoc County, Mississippi
Transportation in Lee County, Mississippi
Transportation in Monroe County, Mississippi